The Zeya (from indigenous Evenki word "djee" (blade); ; , Mölendroff: jingkiri bira) is a northern, left tributary of the Amur in Amur Oblast, Russia.

History
The first Russian documented to enter the area was Vassili Poyarkov.

Course
It rises in the Toko-Stanovik mountain ridge, a part of the Stanovoy Range.

The Zeya flows through the Zeya Reservoir, at the junction of the Tukuringra Range and Dzhagdy Range, and joins the Amur near Blagoveshchensk, at the border with China. Regulation of river discharge by Zeya Dam mitigates extremities of river flow down to 5000 m³/s. The Zeya contributes around 16% of both the average and maximum flow of de Amur because of the flow regulations. In the past, the Zeya could have contributed up to almost 50% of the Amur's maximum flow of approximately 30,000 m³/s.

The main tributaries of the Zeya are Tok, Mulmuga, Bryanta, Gilyuy, and Urkan on the right, and Kupuri, Argi, Dep, Selemdzha, and Tom on the left.

The river freezes from November to May. When it is unfrozen, the river is navigable with the most important river ports being Zeya, Svobodny, and Blagoveshchensk.

See also
List of rivers of Russia

References

External links

Rivers of Amur Oblast